Podocarpus deflexus is a species of conifer in the family Podocarpaceae. It is native to Peninsular Malaysia and Sumatra, Indonesia. It is threatened by habitat degradation.

References

deflexus
Flora of Peninsular Malaysia
Flora of Sumatra
Taxonomy articles created by Polbot